Lauren Sisler is a sports broadcaster who joined ESPN and SEC Network in 2016 as a sideline reporter for both college football and gymnastics. In 2017, she became a reporter for SEC Nation. In addition, she continues to serve as a sports reporter and host at AL.com.

Early life and education
Sisler is a native of Roanoke, Virginia, she graduated from Giles High School, the same high school where future ESPN co-worker Marty Smith (reporter) attended. She was the captain of her gymnastics team at Rutgers University and graduated in 2006 with a communication degree and honors from the School, Information and Library Studies (SCILS). She worked at the Rutgers University Television Network as a sports reporter and segment producer and had a internship at CNBC. Initially, she majored in Sports Medicine before changing to Communications.

Career
Prior to working at ESPN, Sisler returned to her hometown of Roanoke, Virginia to start her career at WDBJ where she worked as a photographer and editor covering local high school and college sports before moving on to WTAP in West Virginia as a weekend sports anchor.  Sisler then moved to Birmingham, Alabama to work at the CBS affiliate WIAT. In 2014 and 2015, she was named Best Sports Anchor by the Alabama Associated Press. In June 2017, she was awarded a regional Emmy for producing an interview between Charles Barkley and Nick Saban.

Personal life
On March 24, 2003, while a freshman at Rutgers University, Sisler unexpectedly lost both of her parents, Lesley and George Sisler, to prescription drug overdoses within hours of each other. Losing her parents provided a devastating blow to Sisler and she was unsure about the future. Her aunt and uncle convinced her to return to Rutgers, where she struggled before regaining control of her life. She speaks about the dangers of addiction and is involved with a few organizations. She has a brother Allen who served 12 years in the Navy. She is a Christian. She is married to John Willard.

References

External links

Lauren Sisler profile at ESPN Press Room

Rutgers University alumni
College football announcers
ESPN people
Living people
Rutgers Scarlet Knights women's gymnasts
1984 births